Events from the year 1672 in Ireland.

Incumbent
Monarch: Charles II

Events
February 25 (6 March N.S.) – John O'Molony is consecrated as Roman Catholic Bishop of Killaloe in Paris.
March 15 – King Charles II of England issues a Royal Declaration of Indulgence, suspending execution of Penal Laws against Roman Catholics in his realms; this is withdrawn the following year under pressure from the Parliament of England.
May 21 – The Earl of Essex is appointed Lord Lieutenant of Ireland (sworn 5 August).
September 24 – elected representatives on corporations are to take an Oath of Supremacy to the Crown unless exempted.
The office of Lord President of Munster is suppressed.
John Lynch's De praesulibus Hiberniae is written (first published in Dublin, 1944).
Sir William Petty's Political Anatomy of Ireland is written (first published in Dublin, 1691); also, engraving of the maps for his Hiberniae Delineatio (published 1685) is completed.

Births
March 12 (bapt.) – Richard Steele, writer and politician, co-founder of The Spectator magazine (d. 1729)
August 7 – Michael Hill, politician (d. 1699)
William Blakeney, 1st Baron Blakeney, soldier (d. 1761)

Deaths
August 10 – Robert Leslie, Church of Ireland Bishop of Clogher.
December 7 – Sir Paul Davys, politician and civil servant (b. c.1600)
Approximate date
Thomas Carve, historian (b. 1590)
Thomas Dillon, 4th Viscount Dillon, peer (b. 1615)

References

 
1670s in Ireland
Ireland
Years of the 17th century in Ireland